Goodenia neogoodenia is a species of flowering plant in the family Goodeniaceae and is endemic to the western part of Western Australia. It is a prostrate, annual herb with round to heart-shaped or rhombic leaves and racemes or spikes of small, brownish flowers.

Description

Taxonomy and naming
This species was first formally described in 1963 by Charles Austin Gardner and Alex George who gave it the name Neogoodenia minutiflora in the Journal of the Royal Society of Western Australia. In 1990 Roger Charles Carolin moved it to the genus Goodenia in the journal Telopea, but since the name Goodenia minutiflora was already used for a plant named by Ferdinand von Mueller, Carolin gave it the name Goodenia neogoodenia. The specific epithet (neogoodenia) is the name of the genus in which the species was originally placed.

Distribution and habitat
This goodenia grows in red loam in shallow depressions in the Carnarvon, Geraldton Sandplains, Murchison and Yalgoo biogeographic regions in the western area of Western Australia.

Conservation status
Goodenia neogoodenia is classified as "Priority Four" by the Government of Western Australia Department of Parks and Wildlife, meaning that is rare or near threatened.

References

neogoodenia
Eudicots of Western Australia
Plants described in 1963
Endemic flora of Australia
Taxa named by Roger Charles Carolin